Dipleurosomatidae is a family of cnidarians belonging to the order Leptomedusae.

Genera:
 Cannota Haeckel, 1879
 Cuvieria Péron, 1807
 Dichotomia Brooks, 1903
 Dipleurosoma Boeck, 1868
 Spectacularia Gershwin, 2005

References

 
Leptothecata
Cnidarian families